The National Board of Review Award for Best Foreign Language Film is one of the annual awards given (since 1934) by the National Board of Review of Motion Pictures.

Winners

1930s

1940s

1950s

1960s

1970s

1980s

1990s

2000s

2010s

2020s

Multiple winners
Ingmar Bergman – 5
Pedro Almodóvar – 4
Asghar Farhadi – 4
Federico Fellini – 3
Akira Kurosawa – 2
Ang Lee – 2
Satyajit Ray – 2

References
 

Film awards for Best Foreign Language Film
Awards established in 1934
1934 establishments in the United States